Sierra del Divisor National Park is a national park in the Amazon rainforest of Peru, established in 2015.

References 

National parks of Peru
Protected areas established in 2015
Geography of Ucayali Region
Geography of Loreto Region
Tourist attractions in Loreto Region
Tourist attractions in Ucayali Region